The O'Shannassy Reservoir is an Australian man-made water supply dammed reservoir. The dam that creates the impoundment is called the O'Shannassy Dam.

Location and features
The reservoir is part of Melbourne's water supply system. Water flows under gravity to Silvan Reservoir, then to storage and distribution reservoirs around Melbourne.

The location was selected as it is at sufficient altitude for gravity supply to the elevated eastern suburbs of Melbourne. A diversion weir on the O'Shannassy River and aqueduct to the Surrey Hills Reservoir in Melbourne were completed in 1914. The weir was complemented by the construction of the dam and its reservoir in 1928, but the weir was still used to divert river flows into the aqueduct. The construction of the Yarra-Silvan conduits in the 1950s resulted in reduced requirements for the aqueduct which was decommissioned in 1997.

See also

 List of reservoirs and dams in Victoria
 Melbourne Water

References

Reservoirs in Victoria (Australia)
1928 establishments in Australia
Yarra Ranges